The 2009 Louisiana–Lafayette Ragin' Cajuns softball team represented the University of Louisiana at Lafayette in the 2009 NCAA Division I softball season. The Ragin' Cajuns played their home games at Lamson Park and were led by ninth and tenth year husband and wife head coaching duo Michael and Stefni Lotief, respectively.

Roster

Coaching staff

Schedule and results

Waco Regional

References

Louisiana Ragin' Cajuns softball seasons
Louisiana softball
Louisiana–Lafayette